Áine is an Irish female given name. It means "radiance" and was the name of the Irish Celtic goddess of wealth and summer: Áine. Notable people with the name include:

 Áine Brady (born 1954), Irish Fianna Fáil politician and teacher
 Áine Rose Daly, British actor and singer
 Áine Lawlor (born 1965), Irish radio broadcaster
 Áine Minogue (born 1977), Irish harpist
 Áine Murphy, Northern Irish politician
 Áine Ní Chonaill (born 1952), Irish activist
 Aine Ni Mhuiri, Irish actress
 Áine O'Gorman (born 1989), Irish footballer
 Áine Phillips, Irish performance artist
 Áine Ní Murchadha, Princess of Leinster, fl. 1169
 Áine Ní Duinn Sleibhe, Queen of Airgíalla, died 1171
 Áine Ní Donnchada, Queen of Breifne, died 1386
 Áine Ní Eochagain, Queen of Fermanagh, died 1466

Irish-language feminine given names